Jibrail Kassab (born 5 August 1938) is a bishop of the Chaldean Catholic Church who presides over the Eparchy of Saint Thomas the Apostle of Sydney in Australia. He has been the bishop of this diocese since its inception on 21 October 2006. His bishopric is currently based at St Thomas the Apostle Chaldean Catholic Church, Bossley Park, New South Wales. Kassab was born in Tel Keppe, Iraq, to an Assyrian family. He was ordained a priest on 19 January 1961. Following 35 years of service in the priesthood, he was elevated to the episcopate by the then Patriarch of Babylon of the Chaldeans, Mar Raphael I Bidawid. Upon his installation, his first post was to serve as archbishop of the Archeparchy of Basra. Following the difficult plight of Iraq's Chaldean Christians during the Iraq War, Pope Benedict XVI transferred Kassab to a safer area and created a diocese in Sydney that would cover all of Australia and New Zealand. He installed Kassab as its head prelate, a post he still holds today.

External links 

Kaldu.org - Eparchy of St Peter the Apostle website
Catholic Hierarchy.org
GCatholic.org Website

Australian people of Iraqi-Assyrian descent
Chaldean archbishops
Iraqi archbishops
Iraqi emigrants to Australia
People from Tel Keppe
Iraqi Eastern Catholics
Australian Eastern Catholics
Living people
1938 births
Iraqi Assyrian people